LVP may refer to:

Science, mathematics, and computing 
 Laser voltage prober, a tool for analysing integrated circuits
 Left ventricular pressure, blood pressure in the heart
 Large volume parenterals, a type of injectable pharmaceutical product
 Lithium vanadium phosphate battery, a proposed type of lithium ion battery
 Low voltage programming, see 
 LView Pro, a bitmap graphics editor for Microsoft Windows

Political parties
 Liberal Vannin Party, a political party on the Isle of Man founded in 2006
 Lithuanian Peasants Party (1990–2001), a former party
 Latvian Unity Party (1992–2001), a former party

Other 
 LView, image editing software
 Lakshmi Vilas Palace, Vadodara, Gujarat, India, a palace
 An abbreviation for works by Dutch composer Leopold van der Pals
 Limited Validity Passport, a type of Australian passport
 Learner Variability Project, an education research translation initiative of Digital Promise that focuses on whole learner education practices
 Luxury vinyl plank, vinyl composition tile with a wood-like appearance